Azete is a heterocyclic chemical compound consisting of an unsaturated four-membered ring with three carbon atoms and one nitrogen atom.

See also
 Azetidine, the saturated analog
 Cyclobutadiene, the homocyclic analog

Nitrogen heterocycles
Four-membered rings